Elaine O'Neil may refer to:

 Elaine Hamilton-O'Neal (1920–2010), American abstract painter and muralist 
 Elaine O'Neal (photographer) (born 1946), American photographer
Elaine O'Neal (politician), American politician and judge